Molotra is a genus of spiders in the family Oonopidae. It was first described in 2011 by Ubick & Griswold. , it contains 6 species, all from Madagascar.

Species
Molotra comprises the following species:
Molotra katarinae Ubick & Griswold, 2011
Molotra milloti Ubick & Griswold, 2011
Molotra molotra Ubick & Griswold, 2011
Molotra ninae Ubick & Griswold, 2011
Molotra suzannae Ubick & Griswold, 2011
Molotra tsingy Ubick & Griswold, 2011

References

Oonopidae
Araneomorphae genera
Spiders of Madagascar